The Gytrash , a legendary black dog known in Northern England, was said to haunt lonely roads awaiting travelers. Appearing in the shape of horses, mules, cranes or dogs, the Gytrash haunt solitary ways and lead people astray, but they can also be benevolent, guiding lost travelers to the right road. They are usually feared.

In some parts of Lincolnshire and Yorkshire, the Gytrash was known as the Shagfoal and took the form of a spectral mule or donkey with eyes that glowed like burning coals. In this form, the beast was believed to be purely malevolent.

The Gytrash's emergence as Rochester's innocuous dog Pilot has been interpreted as a subtle mockery of the mysteriousness and romanticism that surrounds his character and which clouds Jane's perception. Brontë's reference in 1847 is probably the earliest reference to the beast and forms the basis for subsequent citations.

This spirit is also known as Guytrash and Guytresh according to The English Dialect Dictionary of Joseph Wright (1855–1930) where it is defined as a ghost that takes the form of an animal. These include a "great black dog" as well as "an evil cow whose appearance was formerly believed in as a sign of death."

See also 
Barghest
Black dog (folklore)
Black Shuck
Gwyllgi - A similar creature in Welsh folklore 
The Hound of the Baskervilles

References 

English folklore
English legendary creatures
Mythological dogs
Mythological canines
Horses in mythology
Northumbrian folklore
Supernatural legends
Shapeshifting